Longniddry is a coastal village in East Lothian, Scotland, with an estimated population of  in . The Scottish Women's Rural Institute was founded here in 1917.

Features
Longniddry is primarily a dormitory village for commuters, with good transport links by road and rail (Longniddry railway station is on the North Berwick Line) to the capital, some 12 miles to the West.
The village has a number of local, community based resources including local shops and Longniddry Community Centre, which also houses the library. Near to the library is the Scout Hall used by the Longniddry Scout Group. The golf course hosted the Carling-Caledonian Tournament in 1961. Like many coastal towns in East Lothian, Longniddry has a sandy beach beside the golf course. This stretch of local coastline is lined with dunes and known as Longniddry Bents.

History
The 18th century Gosford House, which is the seat of the Earl of Wemyss and March, stands on the eastern edge of the village.

In 1917 the first meeting of the Scottish Women's Rural Institute took place in Longniddry organised by Catherine Hogg Blair. 37 women became members.

In 2006, Longniddry and the neighbouring towns of Prestonpans, Cockenzie and Port Seton were twinned with the town of Barga, Tuscany, Italy.

Notable people
 John Knox, main figure in the Scottish Reformation and disciple of John Calvin was tutor to the sons of the Douglas family who lived at the west side of the village. 
 George Douglas of Longniddry, Scottish courtier
Sir Norman Graham, head of Scottish Education Department
 Hugh MacDiarmid, the Scottish poet, lived in Longniddry for a short while.
 James Bond actor Pierce Brosnan lived in Longniddry from August 1964 with his mother and new stepfather William Carmichael before moving to London.
 Mollie Hunter, winner of the 1974 Carnegie Medal for outstanding books for children.

See also
Longniddry Bents
Longniddry Primary School
Longniddry railway station
List of places in East Lothian

References

External links

 2001 Census Factsheet: Longniddry from East Lothian Council
 Longniddry Parish Church

 
Villages in East Lothian